Otophidium is a genus of cusk-eels, part of the subfamily Ophidiinae in the family Ophidiidae. They are found in the western Atlantic and eastern Pacific.

Species
There are currently four recognized species in this genus:
 Otophidium chickcharney J. E. Böhlke & Robins, 1959 (Ghost cusk-eel)
 Otophidium dormitator J. E. Böhlke & Robins, 1959 (Sleeper cusk-eel)
 Otophidium indefatigabile D. S. Jordan & Bollman, 1890 (Bighead cusk-eel)
 Otophidium omostigma (D. S. Jordan & C. H. Gilbert, 1882) (Polka-dot cusk-eel)

References

Ophidiidae
Ray-finned fish genera
Taxa named by Theodore Gill